WEVA may refer to:

 WEVA (AM), a radio station licensed to Emporia, Virginia, United States
 William Abraham (British Army officer) (1897–1980)
 World Electric Vehicle Association